Pylkkänen is a Finnish surname. Notable people with the surname include:

 Tauno Pylkkänen (1918–1988), Finnish composer
 Paavo Pylkkänen (born 1959), Finnish philosopher of mind
 Jussi Pylkkänen (born 1963), Finnish art dealer

Finnish-language surnames